The Buggles are an English new wave band formed in London in 1977 by singer and bassist Trevor Horn and keyboardist Geoff Downes. They are best known for their 1979 debut single "Video Killed the Radio Star", which topped the UK Singles Chart and reached number one in 15 other countries and was chosen as the song to launch MTV in 1981.

The duo released their first album, The Age of Plastic, in January 1980 with "Video Killed the Radio Star" as its lead single. Soon after the album's release, Horn and Downes joined the progressive rock band Yes, recording and releasing Drama in the process. Following a tour to promote the album, Yes disbanded in 1981. That same year, on 1 August, the music video for "Video Killed the Radio Star" became the first ever shown on MTV in the United States. The following year, the Buggles released a second album, Adventures in Modern Recording. Its lack of commercial success led to the breakup of the group. Since 1998, Horn and Downes have occasionally performed the Buggles' songs.

In October 2011, the Buggles reunited to play at the British Music Experience at the O2 Arena in London. At the 2016 Progressive Music Awards, the Buggles won an "Outer Limit Award".

History

1977–1979: Formation
Downes claimed the group's name derived as a pun on the rock band the Beatles, saying: "It was originally called the Bugs ... studio insects—imaginary creatures who lived in recording studios creating havoc. Then somebody said as a joke that the Bugs would never be as big as the Beatles. So we changed it to the Buggles." Horn later spoke of its name: "I know the name's awful, but at the time it was the era of the great punk thing. I'd got fed up of producing people who were generally idiots but called themselves all sorts of clever names like the Unwanted, the Unwashed, the Unheard ... when it came to choosing our name I thought I'd pick the most disgusting name possible. In retrospect I have frequently regretted calling myself Buggles, but in those days I never really thought much about packaging or selling myself, all that really concerned me was the record."

Horn began his career producing jingles and punk rock groups. Downes was a keyboardist in She's French and graduated from Leeds College of Music in 1975, after which he moved to London looking for keyboard work. The two first met in 1976 at auditions for Tina Charles' backing band and worked with her producer, Biddu, whose backing tracks had an influence on their early work as the Buggles. Horn met musician Bruce Woolley while playing the bass guitar in the house band at the Hammersmith Odeon. Both expressed an interest in Kraftwerk and Daniel Miller, leading them to read Crash by J. G. Ballard. Said Horn, "We had this idea that at some future point there'd be a record label that didn't really have any artists—just a computer in the basement and some mad Vincent Price-like figure making the records ... One of the groups this computer would make would be the Buggles, which was obviously a corruption of the Beatles, who would just be this inconsequential bunch of people with a hit song that the computer had written ... and would never be seen."

In 1977, Horn, Downes and Woolley got together and began recording a selection of demos in a small room above a stonemason shop in Wimbledon, southwest London, including "Video Killed the Radio Star", "Clean, Clean" and "On TV". Though unsure about what they wished to do with the demos, Downes remembered that "we knew even then ... there was some distant goal that had to be reached", and proceeded to re-record the songs at a 16-track recording studio in north London. Initial searches for the right record label to record and release an album failed, but Horn, having begun a relationship with Jill Sinclair, a co-founder of Sarm East Studios, managed to secure plans for a potential deal. However, the demo version of "Video Killed the Radio Star" caught the attention of producer Chris Blackwell of Island Records and, on the day on which Horn and Downes were due to sign with Sarm East, Blackwell offered them a more lucrative deal, which they accepted. Downes claimed Island rejected them three times before a final deal was agreed upon.

1979–1980: The Age of Plastic

With the Island recording contract having been secured, the Buggles recorded their debut studio album, The Age of Plastic, through 1979. Initially, the demo of "Video Killed the Radio Star" featured vocals by Tina Charles, who also helped fund the project. Although the song was primarily a Woolley composition, he ended his association with Horn and Downes to form the Camera Club before the song's release as a single. Making The Age of Plastic involved several months of tiresome and intense experimentation with studio equipment and techniques, struggling to capture the "magic" of the original demos. Debi Doss and Linda Jardim, the female voices on "Video Killed the Radio Star", contributed their vocals to other songs on the album as well.

"Video Killed the Radio Star", the album's lead single, was released first in September 1979 to considerable commercial success, topping the chart in 16 countries. Its music video, directed by Russell Mulcahy, was the first aired on MTV in the United States on 1 August 1981. Film composer Hans Zimmer makes a brief appearance in the video. The Age of Plastic was released in January 1980 and reached No. 27 on the UK Albums Chart. Three subsequent singles were released: "Living in the Plastic Age", "Clean, Clean" and "Elstree", all of which charted in the United Kingdom.

1980–1981: Collaboration with Yes

In early 1980, Horn and Downes began work on a second Buggles album in London, working in a studio next door to that of the progressive rock band Yes, who had lost vocalist Jon Anderson and keyboardist Rick Wakeman following failed recording sessions for a potential new album. In particular, Horn had been a long-standing fan of Yes. The Buggles offered a song to Yes, "We Can Fly from Here", but at the suggestion of Brian Lane, manager of both bands, Yes' bassist Chris Squire invited them to actually replace Anderson and Wakeman as members of Yes. Horn and Downes accepted the offer and joined Squire, Steve Howe and Alan White to record Drama.

The absorption of the Buggles into Yes met with mixed reactions; the band was sometimes booed in the United Kingdom despite its chart position, but not in the United States. Horn admitted that he did not have Anderson's vocal range or style, which many fans missed, but most were still willing to give the new incarnation of Yes a chance. However, some press critics and fans were far less forgiving, especially in the United Kingdom.  The US tour was much less financially successful than expected, and Yes disbanded in December 1980 after the Drama tour ended.

1981–1982: Adventures in Modern Recording

In early 1981, following the disbanding of Yes, Downes and Horn reconvened at Sarm East Studios to record the Buggles' second studio album, Adventures in Modern Recording. However, Downes left the group on the day that the recording was to begin to help form Asia with Howe, citing musical differences. Horn was angry that Island Records renegotiated publishing terms for Downes to join Asia, but never did for Horn since, in his words, he was "washed up, career-wise." To fix this problem, Jill Sinclair made a deal with the French label Carrere, whose leader Claude Carrere, whom Horn described as a "very nice man", helped fund the album. Horn was now left to complete much of the album with several additional personnel.

Released in November 1981, Adventures in Modern Recording involved Horn's experimentation with numerous production techniques, especially with the heavy use of sampling with the Fairlight CMI, with instruments from the computer such as the drums on "Inner City" and the big band jazz sounds on "Vermillion Sands". These same sampling techniques would later be used in records that he produced, such as Slave to the Rhythm by Grace Jones, 90125 by Yes, The Seduction of Claude Debussy by Art of Noise, and Welcome to the Pleasuredome by Frankie Goes to Hollywood. While the album garnered little attention in the United Kingdom, Horn recalled in 2010 that it was a commercial success in France, and in the United States the album peaked at number 161 on the American Billboard 200. By the time of the album's release, when Horn was also producing the album The Lexicon of Love by ABC, he decided to take Sinclair's advice that he was always meant to be a producer rather than a performer or songwriter; thus the performance of "Lenny" on a Dutch television show, with ABC as the backing band, marked the end of the Buggles. As Horn recalled when he was interviewed after the show:

1998–present: Reunion performances
Being largely a studio creation, the Buggles never toured. There were some Top of the Pops playback appearances, and later some performances for promotional purposes in support of the second album, but the first live outing by the original duo came in a low-key appearance on 3 December 1998 at a showcase for new bands on Horn's ZTT Records label at Mean Fiddler in northwest London. During this appearance, the Buggles played only "Video Killed the Radio Star", backed by singer Tessa Niles and one of the other groups on the bill, the Marbles.

On 11 November 2004, the Buggles reunited with Doss, Jardim, Allan and Woolley at Wembley Arena to perform "Video Killed the Radio Star" and "The Plastic Age" as part of a The Prince's Trust charity concert celebrating Horn's career as a producer.

On 28 September 2010, the Buggles performed their first actual concert, billed as "The Lost Gig", at Supperclub in Notting Hill, west London, as a fundraiser for the Royal Hospital for Neuro-disability. Following an opening performance by Orchestral Manoeuvres in the Dark, the Buggles' set included The Age of Plastic performed in its entirety, including Woolley singing with Horn on "Clean, Clean". Also featured were Lol Creme, Chris Braide, Alison Moyet, Gary Barlow, Richard O'Brien and Claudia Brücken.

On 25 October 2011, the Buggles reunited to play at the British Music Experience at the O2 Arena. The gig included the first live performance of "I Am a Camera" and covers of "Space Oddity" by David Bowie and "Check It Out" by Nicki Minaj and will.i.am, which utilised samples from "Video Killed the Radio Star". Kirsten Joy, Holly Petrie and Kate Westall provided backup vocals.

In 2013, Downes spoke of the chance of another reunion: "It's always a challenge working on new stuff, and I'd love to collaborate with Trevor again ... it's not impossibility, just a matter of making the planets align so that one day we can hopefully make it happen." In March 2015, Downes joined the Trevor Horn Band on stage at the Shepherd's Bush Empire to play "The Plastic Age" and "Video Killed the Radio Star". Horn and Downes reunited in the studio in early 2016 for more Buggles activity.

In early 2023, it was announced that the band would be touring as support act for Seal on the latter's 30th anniversary tour, marking the group's first full reunion for a tour.

Artistry and reception
Many of the lyrics Trevor Horn wrote were inspired by sci-fi works by writers such as J. G. Ballard. According to Geoff Downes;

Downes claims to have used George Shearing's "technique of doubling melody lines in block chords (using the 5th note)... quite extensively on some of the Buggles' recordings".

Both of the Buggles' albums have received positive reception from music critics. The Trouser Press called both albums "technically stunning, reasonably catchy and crashingly hollow," while AllMusic's Jeri Montesano said that, compared to 1990s pop music, they "still sound fresh".

Legacy

After leaving the Buggles, Downes joined his former Yes bandmate Steve Howe in forming the aforementioned supergroup Asia, together with John Wetton (formerly from King Crimson) and Carl Palmer (formerly from Emerson, Lake & Palmer), which made its name with the 1982 hit single "Heat of the Moment". Downes remains a member of Asia today, being the only member to have stayed with the group since its beginning. Parallel to Asia, he also worked on other projects, including several solo albums and production of acts such as GTR. In 2011, Downes rejoined Yes as their keyboardist, working once again alongside Horn on the album Fly from Here and accompanying tour.

Horn embarked on a highly successful career as a record producer, achieving success with the bands ABC, Dollar, Frankie Goes to Hollywood, Art of Noise, and even the albums 90125 and Big Generator from a re-formed Yes, with Jon Anderson back on vocals. In 1985, Horn won the Best Producer BRIT Award. More than twenty years on, he is still active, producing with Seal, Tina Turner, Paul McCartney, Tom Jones, Cher, Simple Minds, Belle and Sebastian, t.A.T.u., Charlotte Church, Captain, Pet Shop Boys and Robbie Williams among his many credits. He is currently working with his new band, the Producers, who released the album Made in Basing Street (2012).

Both Asia and Producers have played "Video Killed the Radio Star" as part of their live set in tribute to their members' origins in the Buggles.

In 2009, Horn produced the album Reality Killed the Video Star for British singer Robbie Williams. The album title pays homage to the trademark Buggles song, and Horn performed the song with Williams (Horn on bass and Williams on vocals) at the BBC Electric Proms on 20 October 2009.

Following 2010 discussions with Chris Squire, Horn produced the Yes album Fly from Here (2011), the bulk of whose forty-seven-minute duration comprises unused or incomplete Buggles material from the early 1980s (particularly "We Can Fly from Here"), reminiscent of the use of the Buggles' I am a Camera for "Into the Lens" on Drama during their first stint in 1980. He thus insisted that Downes play keyboards on the album (replacing Oliver Wakeman, son of Rick Wakeman) and Horn himself played and sang backing vocals on the album. The album's group photograph prominently features Horn standing centre, signifying that to all intents he was considered the sixth band member for the recording. The Fly From Here tour did not feature Horn.

In February 2017, Bruce Woolley and his band the Radio Science Orchestra, released a new, dark ambient version of "Video Killed the Radio Star" with singer Polly Scattergood on vocals. The single was released on Gramophone Records, along with a music video featuring musician and producer Thomas Dolby and Wolfgang Wild of Retronaut fame.

The Robot Sings
On 8 March 2017, Horn posted an announcement on his official Facebook page, linking to an article on theatre website Broadway World that Horn, Downes and Woolley were working together on a musical provisionally entitled The Robot Sings. Based on The Tempest by William Shakespeare, and taking influence from sci-fi authors such as J. G. Ballard, Brian Aldiss and Isaac Asimov, the stage show will tell the story of a boy called Jay trying to save his robot companion. The musical will feature "Video Killed The Radio Star" as well as new compositions by Downes, and the script will be written by Jack Woolley.

Band members
 Trevor Horn – lead vocals, bass, guitar, sound effects
 Geoff Downes – piano, keyboards, synthesisers, drums, percussion, backing vocals

Discography

Studio albums
 The Age of Plastic (1980)
 Adventures in Modern Recording (1981)

See also
 List of 1970s one-hit wonders in the United States

References

Further reading
 
 
 Gregory, Andy (2002). International Who's Who in Popular Music 2002. Routledge, .

External links

 Buggles discography on The Art of Noise Online

Musical groups established in 1977
Musical groups disestablished in 1981
English pop music duos
English new wave musical groups
English electronic music duos
English synth-pop groups
Male musical duos
New wave duos
Island Records artists
Carrere Records artists
Art pop musicians
Progressive pop musicians
Second British Invasion artists
Musical groups from the London Borough of Merton